Klytaemnestra (minor planet designation: 179 Klytaemnestra) is a stony Telramund asteroid from the outer regions of the asteroid belt, approximately  in diameter. It was discovered on 11 November 1877, by Canadian-American astronomer James Craig Watson at the old Ann Arbor Observatory in Michigan, United States. It was his last discovery three years before his death. The transitional S-type asteroid has a rotation period of 11.17 hours. It was named after Clytemnestra from Greek mythology.

Orbit and classification 

Together with asteroid 9506 Telramund, Klytaemnestra is the largest members of the Telramund family, a mid-sized family of stony asteroids in the outer main belt, which is also known as the Klytaemnestra family.

It orbits the Sun in the outer main-belt at a distance of 2.6–3.3 AU once every 5 years and 1 month (1,871 days; semi-major axis of 2.97 AU). Its orbit has an eccentricity of 0.11 and an inclination of 8° with respect to the ecliptic. The body's observation arc begins at Lick Observatory in February 1899, more than 21 years after to its official discovery observation at Ann Arbor.

Physical characteristics 

In the Tholen classification, Klytaemnestra is a common stony S-type asteroid, while in the SMASS classification it is a Sk-subtype, that transitions between the S- and K-type asteroids.

Rotation period and poles 

Photometric observations of this asteroid at the Oakley Observatory in Terre Haute, Indiana, during 2006 gave a light curve with a period of 11.13 ± 0.02 hours and a brightness variation of 0.55 ± 0.02 in magnitude. A better rated lightcurve, already obtained by Alan Harris in October 1979, gave a period of 11.173 hours with an amplitude of 0.35.

A modeled lightcurve using photometric data from a larger international collaboration was published in 2016. It gave a period of 11.17342 hours, identical to the 1979-observations by Harris, as well as two spin axes at (65.0°, −6.0°) and (248.0°, −9.0°) in ecliptic coordinates (λ, β).

Diameter and albedo 

According to the surveys carried out by the Infrared Astronomical Satellite IRAS, the Japanese Akari satellite and the NEOWISE mission of NASA's Wide-field Infrared Survey Explorer, Klytaemnestra measures between 64.25 and 90.17 kilometers in diameter and its surface has an albedo between 0.119 and 0.245.

The Collaborative Asteroid Lightcurve Link adopts the results obtained by IRAS, that is, an albedo of 0.1609 and a diameter of 77.69 kilometers based on an absolute magnitude of 8.15.

Naming 

This minor planet was named from Greek mythology after Clytemnestra, the daughter of Leda and the Spartan king Tyndareus. She was the wife of Agamemnon and the mother Orestes, Electra, Iphigenia and Chrysothemis. Clytemnestra and her lover Aegisthus murdered Agamemnon on his return from the Trojan War.

References

External links 
 Asteroid Lightcurve Database (LCDB), query form (info )
 Dictionary of Minor Planet Names, Google books
 Discovery Circumstances: Numbered Minor Planets (1)-(5000) – Minor Planet Center
 
 

000179
Discoveries by James Craig Watson
Named minor planets
000179
000179
18771111